Dominique Lynn Duncan (born 7 May 1990) is an American-Nigerian sprinter who is eligible to compete for her home country Nigeria after switching allegiance from the United States of America in 2014. Dominique is a national and African record holder after she won gold alongside Blessing Okagbare, Regina George and Christy Udoh in the Women's 4 × 200 metres relay event at the 2015 IAAF World Relays in Nassau, Bahamas.

Career

College
On 12 June 2009, Dominique alongside Khrystal Carter, Porscha Lucas and Gabby Mayo broke the NCAA Women's Division I Outdoor Track and Field Championships record in the 4 × 100 metres event after clocking 42.36s before she went on to win gold in the 4 × 100 metres relay event at the 2010 NCAA Division I Outdoor Track and Field Championships.

In 2012, Dominique claimed bronze in the 200 metres event at the 2012 NCAA Division I Outdoor Track and Field Championships.

2014–present
After switching allegiance to Nigeria, Dominique competed at the 2014 African Championships in Athletics claiming bronze and gold at the 200 metres and 4 × 100 metres relay events respectively. She – alongside Blessing Okagbare, Regina George and Christy Udoh – won gold and set a new national record of 1:30.52s in the 4 × 200 metres relay event at the 2015 IAAF World Relays in Nassau, Bahamas.

See also
 List of Nigerian records in athletics
 List of African records in athletics

References

External links
 
 Dominique Duncan at All-Athletics

1990 births
Living people
Track and field athletes from Houston
Nigerian female sprinters
American female sprinters
Nigerian people of African-American descent
Athletes (track and field) at the 2014 Commonwealth Games
Commonwealth Games medallists in athletics
Commonwealth Games silver medallists for Nigeria
Medallists at the 2014 Commonwealth Games